Brabazon William Disney was an Irish Dean in the middle of the 19th century.
 
Disney was born in County Louth on 13 July 1797 and educated at Trinity College, Dublin. He held incumbencies at Siddan, Stackallan and Inishmot before becoming Archdeacon of Raphoe in 1835, a post he held  for ten years until he became Dean of Emly. In his spare time he compiled an eight-volume collection of his sermons. He was Dean of Armagh from 1851 until his death on 20 December 1874.

There is a memorial to his wife Anna on the wall of the north transept of St Patrick's Cathedral, Armagh.

Arms

References

Irish Anglicans
Deans of Emly
Deans of Armagh
Archdeacons of Raphoe
People from County Louth
1874 deaths
1797 births
Alumni of Trinity College Dublin